Aero India is a biennial air show and aviation exhibition held in Bengaluru, India at the Yelahanka Air Force Station. It is organised by the Defence Exhibition Organisation, Ministry of Defence.

Organisers
The Defence Ministry of India, Indian Air Force, Hindustan Aeronautics Limited Defence Research and Development Organisation (DRDO), Department of Space, the Union Civil Aviation Ministry and other such organisations organise the Aero India show.

Air shows
The first edition of the air show was held in 1996. Subsequently, the Aero India has emerged as a significant  military aviation exhibitions. The Mikoyan MiG-35 and F-16IN Super Viper were unveiled for the first time at the 6th and 7th editions of Aero India respectively.

Gallery

References

External links 

 Aero India 
 AeroIndia.org is a volunteer collaborative project to provide Aer India 2007 News, Photographs and Videos
 Aero India 2005 Photographs and web coverage at India Defence
 Photo feature of Aero India Show 2001 on www.bangalorebest.com
 "Aero India show begins on Wednesday..." – rediff.com article dated 4 February 2003
 "Aero India show attracts 146 companies" – The Financial Express story dated 28 January 2005

1996 establishments in Karnataka
Air shows
Festivals established in 1996
Indian Air Force